Vargö is a small island, one of the westmost in the Southern Göteborg Archipelago of Sweden. Facing the open sea, it is an almost completely barren island, and a nature reserve.

References

Southern Gothenburg Archipelago
Islands of Västra Götaland County